Ghulam Hassan Mir is an Indian politician from Jammu and Kashmir, India. He is a member of the Jammu and Kashmir Apni Party. He was the founding member of the Jammu and Kashmir Peoples Democratic Party. He was elected to the Gulmarg constituency of Jammu and Kashmir Legislative Assembly in 2002 as a Jammu and Kashmir Peoples Democratic Party candidate. He was a law minister in Ghulam Mohammad Shah led cabinet. He was minister of tourism in the Mufti Mohammad Sayeed led cabinet from 2002 to 2006.

References

Living people
People from Baramulla
Jammu and Kashmir Peoples Democratic Party politicians
Apni Party politicians
1950 births
Jammu and Kashmir MLAs 1983–1986
Jammu and Kashmir MLAs 2002–2008
Jammu and Kashmir MLAs 2008–2014